Marion Township is one of the thirteen townships of Clinton County, Ohio, United States. The 2010 census reported 5,394 people living in the township, 1,151 of whom lived in the unincorporated portions.

Geography
Located in the southwest corner of the county, it borders the following townships:
Vernon Township - north
Washington Township - northeast
Jefferson Township - east
Perry Township, Brown County - south
Wayne Township, Clermont County - southwest
Harlan Township, Warren County - west

The entire township lies in the Virginia Military District.

Most of the village of Blanchester is located in western Marion Township.

Name and history
Marion Township was established in 1830.

It is one of twelve Marion Townships statewide.

Historic population figures

Government
The township is governed by a three-member board of trustees, who are elected in November of odd-numbered years to a four-year term beginning on the following January 1. Two are elected in the year after the presidential election and one is elected in the year before it. There is also an elected township fiscal officer, who serves a four-year term beginning on April 1 of the year after the election, which is held in November of the year before the presidential election. Vacancies in the fiscal officership or on the board of trustees are filled by the remaining trustees.

References
Clinton County Historical Society.  Clinton County, Ohio, 1982.  Wilmington, Ohio:  The Society, 1982.
Ohio Atlas & Gazetteer.  6th ed. Yarmouth, Maine:  DeLorme, 2001.  
Ohio. Secretary of State.  The Ohio municipal and township roster, 2002-2003.  Columbus, Ohio:  The Secretary, 2003.

External links
County website

Townships in Clinton County, Ohio
Townships in Ohio